Peter Canero (born 18 January 1981) is a Scottish former footballer, who played as a defender and midfielder. He began his career with Kilmarnock, where he made over 100 appearances. He also had brief spells with Leicester City in England, Dundee United back in Scotland and New York Red Bulls in the United States before his career ended due to injury. He made one appearance for the Scotland national team in 2004.

Career
Canero, who is of Spanish descent through his grandfather who fled the country during the Spanish Civil War, came up through the youth ranks at Kilmarnock. He made his first-team debut in August 1999 at the age of 18 as a late substitute in the home league win over Aberdeen. Featuring in nearly a dozen matches that season, Canero began season 2000–01 as a first-team regular, scoring his first goals for the club in February 2001 in the League Cup semi-final win against St Mirren and subsequent league win against St Johnstone to help Kilmarnock qualify for Europe. At the start of the 2002–03 season and between January and March 2003, he scored five goals in six league appearances. By December 2003, Canero was establishing himself as one of the most promising players in Scotland and with his contract expiring in June 2004, was offered a new three-year deal in December 2003. Celtic were interested in signing Canero, but were unable to offer a transfer fee for him to move in January 2004. Later that month, Canero moved to Premier League side Leicester City.

Canero did not make his Leicester debut until mid-March, due to a hip and knee problem, when he appeared as a late substitute in the win at Birmingham City. He went on to appear in around half of the remaining fixtures that season in the Premiership, most notably against Leeds when he missed a glorious chance to win the game. After undergoing a hip operation and missing the last two games of the season, Canero struggled to make an impact in the Leicester first team due to injury, and he featured only six times before the New Year. His last appearance came in November 2004 and after being an unused substitute on several occasions, he was released by mutual consent in July 2005. He moved to Dundee United on a short-term loan deal in September 2005, before signing with MetroStars of Major League Soccer in January 2006. He was waived by the team, now known as New York Red Bulls, at the end of an injury-hit season during which he played only 278 minutes for the club. He subsequently retired due to persistent injuries.

Canero was capped for Scotland at all youth levels (U15s, U16s and U17s), including 18 appearances for the under-21 team. He also appeared three times for the Scotland B team, against Germany, Turkey and Croatia. Canero was given his first (and only) cap for the senior national team in April 2004, as an early substitute in the friendly match against Denmark.

Career statistics

References

External links 

 
 

1981 births
Living people
Footballers from Glasgow
Scottish people of Spanish descent
Scottish footballers
Kilmarnock F.C. players
Leicester City F.C. players
Dundee United F.C. players
New York Red Bulls players
Scottish Premier League players
Premier League players
English Football League players
Major League Soccer players
Scotland international footballers
Scotland B international footballers
Scotland under-21 international footballers
Scottish expatriate footballers
Expatriate soccer players in the United States
Scottish expatriate sportspeople in the United States
Association football midfielders
Association football fullbacks